St. Angelo Fort (also known as Kannur Fort or Kannur Kotta) is a fort facing the Arabian Sea, situated 3 km from Canannore (Kannur), a city in Kerala state, south India.

History

In 1498, during Vasco da Gama's visit to India, the local Kolathiri king granted the land to Portuguese to build a settlement in present-day Kerala. On 23 October 1505, he gave the Portuguese leader Francisco de Almeida the permission to build a fort at the site. The construction activity began the very next day, on 24 October 1505, when Goncalo Gil Barbosa - the Portuguese factor of Cannanore (Kannur) - laid the foundation stone. The construction of the wooden fort was completed on 30 October 1505: its first Captain was Lourenco Britto, who led a garrison of 150 Portuguese men, and controlled two ships in the sea. After the fort was completed, Almeida began using the title "Viceroy", and in 1507, he started the construction of a stone fort at the site.

The fort was later attacked in vain by the local Indian ruler Zamorin and Kolathiri in the Siege of Cannanore (1507).

In August 1509 Almeida, refusing to recognize Afonso de Albuquerque's as the new Portuguese governor to supersede himself, arrested him in this fortress after having fought the naval Battle of Diu. Afonso de Albuquerque was released after six months' confinement, and become governor on the arrival of the grand-marshal of Portugal with a large fleet, in October 1509.

The fort provided naval supplies for the Portuguese conquest of Goa and the Portuguese battles against Mamuluk. As the local Portuguese settlement at Kannur had no sources of revenue, the fort's expenses were met with funding from Goa, the seat of Portuguese rule in India.

On 15 February 1663, the Dutch captured the fort from the Portuguese. They modernised the fort and built the bastions Hollandia, Zeelandia and Frieslandia that are the major features of the present structure. The original Portuguese fort was pulled down later. A painting of this fort and the fishing ferry behind it can be seen in the Rijksmuseum Amsterdam. The Dutch sold the fort to king Ali Raja of Arakkal in 1772. In 1790 the British seized it and used it as their chief military station in Malabar until 1947.

The fort is in the Cannanore Cantonment area. It is fairly well preserved as a protected monument under the Archaeological Survey of India. St Angelo's fort is a most important historical monument and a popular tourist attraction. Six Tourism Policeman are posted here for protection duty.

In 2015, thousands of cannonballs weighing several kilos were discovered from the Fort premises. The Archaeological Survey of India, which led the excavation, believes these were buried as part of military preparedness.

Present status

The Moppila Bay Harbor and Arakkal Mosque are near the fort. The fort is now well-maintained under the supervision of the Archaeological Survey of India. Tourists are allowed entry to the fort every day of the week between 8 AM to 6 PM.

References

Forts in Kerala
Portuguese forts in India
Colonial Kerala
Buildings and structures in Kannur
Portuguese in Kerala
Archaeological sites in Kerala
Infrastructure completed in 1505
1505 establishments in India
1500s establishments in Portuguese India
Tourist attractions in Kannur district
16th-century forts in India
Monuments of National Importance in Kerala